Archbishop Ryan High School (often called Archbishop Ryan or simply Ryan) is a Roman Catholic high school located in Philadelphia, Pennsylvania, US. The school is named after Patrick John Ryan, Archbishop of Philadelphia from 1894 to 1911.

Established in 1966, Archbishop Ryan High School is the largest Catholic secondary school in the city of Philadelphia with a current enrollment of 1,325 students.  The students come from over 60 catholic, public and charter elementary schools in Philadelphia, Bucks, and Montgomery County.

Archbishop Ryan High School consists of extensive technology resources:
84 classrooms, 7 computer labs, 3 music rooms, 2 newly renovated science labs, 2 state-of-the-art sports gymnasiums, 2 art studios, 1, 1 graphic design lab, 1 iMac Music Tech Lab, and 1 new Black Box Theater that was dedicated in the Spring of 2013 and seats 140 people. The entire school is wireless with internet access.

Over 600 of Archbishop Ryan's current students are second generation Ryan students.

History
Archbishop Ryan High Schools first opened in 1966 as a co-institutional facility, i.e., two separate single-sex facilities with separate administration and faculty for each side of the building.  Founded under the jurisdiction of the Roman Catholic Archdiocese of Philadelphia, Archbishop Ryan was the twenty-eighth archdiocesan high school to be founded.  The process of merging the two schools into one co-educational school began in 1988.

Ryan was the twenty-eighth archdiocesan high school, the sixth begun by Cardinal John Krol, who continued the tradition of furthering Catholic education in the Philadelphia archdiocese. The  tract on Academy Road accommodates a spacious school building, and outdoor athletic fields as well as parking areas. The original design by architects, Dagit Associates, eased the merger. The central shared facilities of auditorium, library media center, and chapel serve the coeducational student body. Ryan draws students from all across the Philadelphia area extending into the surrounding suburban areas.

In the summer of 2014, Archbishop Ryan hired the current president, Denise LePera, as the previous president, Michael McArdle, was appointed to the office of Director of Financial Aid in the Office of Catholic Education within the Archdiocese of Philadelphia.  In June 2017, Denise LePera stepped down as President of Archbishop Ryan.  In November 2017, Michael Barnett '90 was appointed the newest President of Archbishop Ryan.  He resigned in May 2021.  The current principal, Joseph McFadden, is currently serving as Interim President as he continues serving as the school Principal.

Notable alumni

Steve Farrell, class of 1978, former bassist in Philadelphia hardcore punk band Kid Dynamite
Christopher Ferguson, class of 1979, pilot of Atlantis Space Shuttle for NASA, September 2006
Tom Filer, class of 1974, Major League Baseball pitcher from 1982–1992 for Chicago Cubs, Toronto Blue Jays, Milwaukee Brewers, and New York Mets;  pitching coach of Altoona Curve, Double-A affiliate of Pittsburgh Pirates
Matt Knowles, class of 1988, professional soccer player from 1990-2003
Jonathan Loughran, actor, personal assistant to Adam Sandler
Chris McKendry, class of 1986, ESPN Sportscenter anchor
Chris Mooney, class of 1990, head coach of University of Richmond Spiders men's basketball team
Patrick Murphy, class of 1991, member of United States House of Representatives from Pennsylvania's 8th Congressional District, first Iraq War veteran in Congress
Dennis M. O'Brien, class of 1970, was 137th speaker of Pennsylvania House of Representatives; has represented Pennsylvania's 169th Legislative District in Northeast Philadelphia since 1979
Christina Perri, class of 2004, singer known for her song Jar of Hearts and A Thousand Years
Jimmy Shubert, stand-up comedian
Ray Staszak, class of 1980, first Pennsylvanian to play in National Hockey League after Pete Babando, who decades earlier scored game-winning goal in overtime in Game 7 of the 1950 Stanley Cup Finals
Frank Wycheck, class of 1989, NFL tight end, color commentator on Tennessee Titans radio network; one of only five tight ends to surpass 500 receptions in NFL history
Joe Zeglinski, class of 2006, professional basketball player

Academics
Ryan offers a variety of studies such as English, Social Studies, Mathematics, Natural and Physical Science Studies, World Languages (Spanish and Latin), Business, Technology, Religion, Music, and Fine Art Studies. Coursework is required in the fields of English, Social Studies, Mathematics, Natural and Physical Science Studies, Religion and World Languages.

Archbishop Ryan has a student/teacher ratio of 21:1. Ryan offers both courses in writing skills and digital literacy, and has 11 AP classes.  Ryan offers a 4-year art program, including AP art and a 4-year music instrumental program. Ryan also offers a music tech course. Holy Family University offers college level courses at the Ryan campus for seniors during the regular school day.

Archbishop Ryan hosts the archdiocesan program for students with diagnosed learning needs, the Bonaventure Program.  The Bonaventure Program is for applicants with an IEP.

The Class of 2013 received $18 million in scholarships and financial aid for post-graduate study.  Approximately 92% of Ryan's graduates go on to higher education.

Athletics
The competitive boys' sports of Archbishop Ryan include baseball, basketball, football, wrestling, bowling, cross country, ice hockey, golf, indoor/outdoor track and field, lacrosse, soccer, swimming, and tennis.
The competitive girls' sports of Archbishop Ryan include basketball, bowling, cross country, field hockey, indoor/outdoor track and field, lacrosse, ragdoll cheerleading, raider cheerleading, soccer, softball, tennis, volleyball, and swimming.

Extracurricular activities

Almost 94% of the student body at Archbishop Ryan participates in after school activities and sports. The school has over 74 clubs with everything from Strategy Games club to a Sewing club.

Archbishop Ryan has a theater program that produces two musical productions per year. It also hosts a summer program that produces a summer musical. Their auditorium's sound booth provides Izod Surround Sound 55:1 settings.

The Ryan Review, Archbishop Ryan's award-winning newspaper, has received recognition year-after-year for journalistic excellence. All of the Review's editors are members of the Quill & Scroll International Honor Society for High School Journalism and the staff writers study closely with the editors. The staff uses Associated Press Formatting and InDesign to produce their paper. The Ryan Review does most of its own photography through the Photo Editor and two photographers through the use of a Nikon D40 camera with a 14-155mm lens. This paper also features a texting service to allow student interaction with the editors.

The Yearbook provides a way for students to participate in creating a yearbook which will be handed out to each graduating class as part of their prom fee. Students use InDesign, Photoshop, and Paint to do layout work for the yearbook and take most of their own pictures, using digital cameras and a single Nikon D300.

Other clubs and activities include:
Ambassadors
American Math Competition
Asian Student Association
American Sign Language Club
Art Club
Book Club
Chorus
Community Service Corps
Concert Band
Creative Writing Club
Fishing Club
Jazz Band
Pit Orchestra
Pep Band
Future Business Leaders of America (FBLA)
Future Engineers
Garden Club
Health Careers Club
Interact Club
Mathletes (JV and Varsity)
National Honor Society (Rho Kappa, National English Honor Society, Nuestro Capitulo)
No Place for Hate
Orchestra
Ryan for Life
Ryan Pride
Speech and Debate Team
Stage Crew
Student Council
Table Tennis
Protect our Schools
Tribe-a-Thon Planning Team
TV Studio/Media Club
Renaissance Club
AR Minds Matter

References

External links
Archbishop Ryan's Official Website

Roman Catholic secondary schools in Philadelphia
Irish-American culture in Philadelphia
Educational institutions established in 1966
High schools in Philadelphia
Eastern Pennsylvania Rugby Union
1966 establishments in Pennsylvania
Northeast Philadelphia